The Inverness and Richmond Railway was a railway that operated on Cape Breton Island in Nova Scotia from 1901 to the 1980s. It is now a rail trail for snowmobiles, all-terrain vehicles, and human-powered transport called the Celtic Shores Coastal Trail.

History

Service from Port Hawkesbury to Inverness opened in 1901. The purpose of the railway was to haul coal from mines around Mabou and Inverness to a pier in Port Hastings.

It was developed and operated by the Inverness Railway and Coal Company. It connected with existing stations of the Intercolonial Railway at Orangedale and Port Hawkesbury.  Although its name refers to two adjacent Cape Breton counties, it was never extended into Richmond County.

Peak operation was in 1908 with 322,000 tons of freight, mostly coal, but also lumber. The line also carried passengers, averaging 26,530 per year from 1901 to 1906.

Financial difficulties began in 1915. It was purchased by the Canadian National Railway in 1929. Passenger service ended in 1959. By 1975 service was once a week, hauling coal from St. Rose in the north of the island.

References

Defunct Nova Scotia railways
Transport in Inverness County, Nova Scotia
Railway companies established in 1887
Railway companies disestablished in 1929